North Korea ranks as the least democratic country in the world in The Economist Intelligence Unit's Democracy Index, while The Heritage Foundation and The Wall Street Journals Index of Economic Freedom places the country as the one with least economic freedom. According to the Press Freedom Index, North Korea has the least free press in the world.

According to the Walk Free Foundation's Global Slavery Index, North Korea has the highest proportion of people in modern slavery. The Open Doors foundation's World Watch List lists the country as the worst persecutor of Christians in the world.

Economy

Politics, law and military

Science and technology

Society and quality of life

See also

Outline of North Korea
International rankings of South Korea
List of international rankings

References

North Korea